Kari Brattset Dale (born 15 February 1991) is a Norwegian handball player for Győri ETO KC and the Norwegian national team.

She made her debut on the Norwegian national team in March 2016.

Achievements
Olympic Games:
Bronze: 2020
World Championship:
Gold Medalist: 2021
Silver Medalist: 2017
European Championship:
Winner: 2020
EHF Champions League:
Winner: 2019
Finalist: 2022
Bronze: 2021
EHF Cup:
Finalist: 2018
Norwegian League:
Winner: 2017/2018 
Silver: 2014/2015, 2016/2017
Bronze: 2015/2016
Norwegian Cup:
Winner: 2017
Silver: 2015
Hungarian Championship
Winner: 2019, 2022
Hungarian Cup:
Winner: 2019, 2021

Individual awards
 All-Star Line Player of Postenligaen: 2013/2014
 All-Star Line Player of Grundigligaen: 2015/2016, 2016/2017
 All Star Line Player of Eliteserien: 2017/2018
 Best Player of Eliteserien: 2017/2018
 Eliteserien's "public favorite": 2017/2018
 Handball-Planet.com All-Star Line Player of the Year: 2019
 Most Valuable Player of the World Handball Championship: 2021
 Best Defender of the EHF Champions League: 2022

Personal life
On 25 April 2022, Dale announced her pregnancy. She gave birth to her son, Nils on the 1st of November 2022.

References

External links
 
 
 Kari Brattset Dale at the Norwegian Handball Federation 
 
 

1991 births
Living people
People from Sarpsborg
Norwegian female handball players
Expatriate handball players
Norwegian expatriate sportspeople in Hungary
Győri Audi ETO KC players
Handball players at the 2020 Summer Olympics
Olympic bronze medalists for Norway
Medalists at the 2020 Summer Olympics
Olympic medalists in handball
Sportspeople from Viken (county)
Olympic handball players of Norway